Statutory city may refer to:
 Statutory city (Austria), an Austrian municipality acting as a district administrative authority
 Statutory city (Czech Republic), a Czech city with special privileges
 Statutory city (Minnesota), a Minnesota city that is not a home rule charter city
 Kreisfreie Stadt (or Stadtkreis), a German city acting as a district administrative authority
 Statutory city (Poland), a Polish city acting as a county

See also
 Independent city, a similar concept in the United States
 Unitary authority, a similar concept in the United Kingdom